Cipollone is a surname of Italian origin, a nickname for someone with a big head from the augmentative of the Italian word cipolla meaning "onion". Notable people with the surname include:

 Pat Cipollone (born c. 1966), American lawyer
 Peter Cipollone (born 1971), American coxswain

See also 
 
 Cipollina (disambiguation)
 Cipollini (disambiguation)
 Cipollino (disambiguation)
 Chipolin (disambiguation)
 Cipolla (disambiguation)

References 

Italian-language surnames